Spanagonicus is a genus of plant bugs in the family Miridae. There are about five described species in Spanagonicus.

Species
These five species belong to the genus Spanagonicus:
 Spanagonicus albofasciatus (Reuter, 1907) (whitemarked fleahopper)
 Spanagonicus argentinus Berg, 1883
 Spanagonicus aricanus Carvalho, 1984
 Spanagonicus schusterus Menard, 2015
 Spanagonicus tiquiensis Carvalho & Carpintero, 1990

References

Further reading

 
 
 

Phylinae
Articles created by Qbugbot